The Ministry of Petroleum and Minerals (MPM;) is the government department of East Timor accountable for energy policy, management of mineral resources, and related matters.

Functions
The Ministry is responsible for the design and implementation of policies for the following areas:

 energy;
 management of mineral resources, including oil and other strategic ores;

and for the licensing and regulation of extractive activity and industrial activity to benefit petroleum and minerals, including petrochemicals and refining.

Minister
The incumbent Minister of Petroleum and Minerals is Víctor da Conceição Soares.

See also 
 List of petroleum ministries
 Politics of East Timor

References

External links

  – official site  

Petroleum and Minerals
East Timor
East Timor
East Timor, Petroleum and Minerals
2001 establishments in East Timor